XEDKN-AM is a radio station on 1230 AM in Guadalajara, Jalisco. It is owned by Radio Fórmula and carries its news and talk programming.

History
XEZAJ-AM 1220, to be located in Zapopan, received its concession on August 5, 1988. It was owned by Radiorama through concessionaire Mensajes Musicales, S.A. Radiorama sold it to Radio Fórmula in 2002 after changing the callsign to XEDKN-AM, and in 2006, it moved to 1230 kHz.

References

Radio stations in Guadalajara